The Klee–Minty cube or Klee–Minty polytope (named after Victor Klee and George J. Minty) is a unit hypercube of variable dimension whose corners have been perturbed. Klee and Minty demonstrated that George Dantzig's simplex algorithm has poor worst-case performance when initialized at one corner of their "squashed cube". On the three-dimensional version, the simplex algorithm and the criss-cross algorithm visit all 8 corners in the worst case. 

In particular, many optimization algorithms for linear optimization exhibit poor performance when applied to the Klee–Minty cube. In 1973 Klee and Minty showed that Dantzig's simplex algorithm was not a polynomial-time algorithm when applied to their cube. Later, modifications of the Klee–Minty cube have shown poor behavior both for other basis-exchange pivoting algorithms and also for interior-point algorithms.

Description of the cube 

The Klee–Minty cube was originally specified with a parameterized system of linear inequalities, with the dimension as the parameter. When the dimension is two, the "cube" is a squashed square. When the dimension is three, the "cube" is a squashed cube. Illustrations of the "cube" have appeared besides algebraic descriptions.

The Klee–Minty polytope is given by

This has D variables, D constraints other than the D non-negativity constraints, and 2D vertices, just as a D-dimensional hypercube does. If the objective function to be maximized is

and if the initial vertex for the simplex algorithm is the origin, then the algorithm as formulated by Dantzig visits all 2D vertices, finally reaching the optimal vertex

Computational complexity 
The Klee–Minty cube has been used to analyze the performance of many algorithms, both in the worst case and on average. The time complexity of an algorithm counts the number of arithmetic operations sufficient for the algorithm to solve the problem. For example, Gaussian elimination requires on the order of D3 operations, and so it is said to have polynomial time-complexity, because its complexity is bounded by a cubic polynomial. There are examples of algorithms that do not have polynomial-time complexity. For example, a generalization of Gaussian elimination called Buchberger's algorithm has for its complexity an  exponential function of the problem data (the degree of the polynomials and the number of variables of the multivariate polynomials). Because exponential functions eventually grow much faster than polynomial functions, an exponential complexity implies that an algorithm has slow performance on large problems.

Worst case 

In mathematical optimization, the Klee–Minty cube is an example that shows the worst-case computational complexity of many algorithms of linear optimization. It is a deformed cube with exactly  2D corners in dimension D. Klee and Minty showed that Dantzig's simplex algorithm visits all corners of a (perturbed) cube in dimension D in the worst case.

Modifications of the Klee–Minty construction showed similar exponential time complexity for other pivoting rules of simplex type, which maintain primal feasibility, such as Bland's rule. Another modification showed that the criss-cross algorithm, which does not maintain primal feasibility,  also visits all the corners of a modified Klee–Minty cube. Like the simplex algorithm, the criss-cross algorithm visits all 8 corners of the three-dimensional cube in the worst case.

Path-following algorithms 
Further modifications of the Klee–Minty cube have shown poor performance of central-path–following algorithms for linear optimization, in that the central path comes arbitrarily close to each of the corners of a cube. This "vertex-stalking" performance is surprising, because such path-following algorithms have polynomial-time complexity for linear optimization.

Average case 
The Klee–Minty cube has also inspired research on average-case complexity. When eligible pivots are made randomly (and not by the rule of steepest descent), Dantzig's simplex algorithm needs on average quadratically many steps (on the order of O(D2).
Standard variants of the simplex algorithm takes on average D steps for a cube. When it is initialized at a random corner of the cube, the criss-cross algorithm visits only D additional corners, however, according to a 1994 paper by Fukuda and Namiki.  Both the simplex algorithm and the criss-cross algorithm visit exactly 3 additional corners of the three-dimensional cube on average.

See also 
 Projective algorithm of Karmarkar
 Ellipsoidal algorithm of Khachiyan

Notes

References

External links

Algebraic description with illustration 
The first two links have both an algebraic construction and a picture of a three-dimensional  Klee–Minty cube:

Pictures with no linear system 
 Articles of E. Nematollahi, which discuss the Klee-Minty cube with illustrations.
 A picture of a Klee-Minty cube showing a simplex-algorithm path (automatic translation of German) by Günter Ziegler. The picture in the second half of the page.

Linear programming
Analysis of algorithms
Computational complexity theory
Convex geometry
Cubes